Arunachalam. Sakunthala (C. I. D. Sakunthala) is an Indian  actress. She has filled roles as a Heroine, Item number Dancer, and Villainess in over 600 Tamil, Telugu, Kannada and Malayalam films. The first movie in which she performed as an actress was CID Shankar, following which she was referred to as "C. I. D. Sakunthala". After that, Sakunthala became more popular. It was a Tamil thriller which released on 1 May 1970. Directed by R Sundaram. In the movie 'Thavaputhalvan', she played a ruthless villainous role revengeful on Sivaji Ganesan that film praised by the fans.

Early life 
Sakunthala's native is Arisipalayam, Salem. Her parents named her after an old Tamil movie Sakuntalai. Her father Arunachalam was employed at Thiruverumbur. She learned to dance and danced at a show hosted by Lalitha - Padmini - Ragini in Chennai. Thereafter, she gradually entered the cinema industry. She acted in a play “Suriyan Merkkeyium Uthikkum”. She had danced in item numbers in films, acted as a vamp, played the villain's side-kick and donned the role of the heroine's friend in a few films. After playing small roles, she made a name for herself in the industry. She acted as the heroine in a few films too.

Family 
She has a large family four brother and two sisters.

Film career 
Her role in Sivaji's Padikkadha Methai, Kai Koduttha Dheivam, Thirudan, Thavapudhalavan, Vasantha Maligai, Neethi, Bharatha Vilas, Rajaraja Cholan, Ponnunjal, Engal Thanga Raja, Thaai, Anbai Thedi, Vaira Nenjam, Gruhapravesam, Rojavin Raja, Avan Oru Sarithiram, Andaman Kadhali, Justice Gopinath, Naan Vazhavaippen and  Keezh Vaanam Sivakkum was widely talked about her character. Her notable films such as Dharisanam, En Annan, Kalyana Oorvalam, Idhaya Veenai, Kattila Thottila, Thedi Vantha Lakshmi, Thirumalai Thenkumari, Karunthel Kannayiram, Athirshtakaran, Roshakkari including films were successful. She has acted in films of great actors like Sivaji and MGR. After stopping acting in films, Sakuntala is currently working in the television series.

Filmography 
This is a partial filmography. You can expand it.

1950s

1960s

1970s

1980s

1990s

Television

References

External links 

Indian film actresses
Actresses in Tamil cinema
20th-century Indian actresses
Actresses in Tamil television
Tamil television actresses
Indian television actresses
Tamil actresses
Living people
Year of birth missing (living people)
Actresses in Malayalam cinema
Actresses in Telugu cinema